Silverstream railway station is a suburban railway station serving Silverstream in Upper Hutt, New Zealand. The station is served by Metlink's electric multiple unit trains of the "Matangi" FP class. Trains stopping at Silverstream run to Wellington and Upper Hutt.

The station has an island platform between two tracks, linked to Field Street in the south by a footpath, and to Fergusson Drive in the north-west and Whitemans Road to the north-east via pedestrian level crossings.

Services

Rail
TransDev operates Hutt Valley Line electric suburban services between Wellington and Upper Hutt via Silverstream. The basic daytime off-peak timetable is:
3 tph to Wellington, stopping all stations (2 tph on weekends)
3 tph to Upper Hutt, stopping all stations (2 tph on weekends)

The basic morning peak timetable is:
3 tph to Wellington, stopping all stations to Taita then Waterloo only
2 tph to Upper Hutt, stopping all stations

Bus
The following Metlink bus services serve the station:

History 
The present Silverstream railway station replaced the earlier station from 21 November 1954 when the section of line alongside the hill south of Silverstream, which passed over the wooden truss bridge just below Silverstream Hospital, was closed. The deviation of the line is some distance to the west of the original line and crosses the Hutt River on a steel bridge with concrete piers - the replacement station is several hundred yards to the north of the old station.

An adjacent level crossing had automatically locking gates installed to stop pedestrians using the crossing until a second train clears the crossing (after a 2003 accident).

The station was damaged by a small fire circa 2000, which left it leaking and with no lights under the shelter for several years. The fire damage showed until some repairs were made that the station had toilets at one point until the area was boarded up again.

In 2019–20 the GWRC is to "renew" the Silverstream railway station.

References

External links
 Passenger service timetables from Metlink

Rail transport in Wellington
Railway stations in New Zealand
Buildings and structures in Upper Hutt
Railway stations opened in 1954
Public transport in the Wellington Region